Sir Bruce Rodda Williams , (10 January 1919 – 9 August 2010) was an Australian  academic and vice-chancellor of the University of Sydney.

Early life
Williams was born on 10 January 1919 in Warragul, Victoria, Australia as the youngest child of William James Williams, Methodist Minister (1884-1956) and his wife, Helen Sarah Baud (1885-1967).

Education
William was a student at Wesley College and the University of Melbourne.

Career
In 1940 Williams joined the faculty of the University of Adelaide. Then in 1946 he joined the faculty of Queen's University Belfast. He joined Keele University In 1950, as professor of economics.

From 1959 Williams was at the University of Manchester, as Robert Otley Professor of Economics, 1959–63, and then Stanley Jevons Professor of Political Economy, 1963–67. He was appointed as vice-chancellor of the University of Sydney in 1967, and retired in 1981.

In 1982, Williams delivered the annual series of Australian Broadcasting Corporation Boyer Lectures on "Living With Technology".

Marriage and issue
On 27 July 1942, Williams was married to Roma Olive Hotten (1916-1992) and they had five daughters. His eldest daughter Helen (b. 1945) is married to Friedrich Freiherr von Reibnitz (b. 1942), the only son of Günther Hubertus Freiherr von Reibnitz and his second wife, Countess Maria Anna Szapáry von Muraszombath, Széchysziget et Szapár (1911–1998). Friedrich is also an elder brother of Princess Michael of Kent. 

Sir Bruce Rodda Williams died on 9 August 2010.

Honours and awards
1968 Elected Fellow of the Academy of the Social Sciences in Australia
1980 Knight Commander of the Order of the British Empire for "Services to education & to government"

References

1919 births
2010 deaths
Australian Knights Commander of the Order of the British Empire
University of Melbourne alumni
Academic staff of the University of Adelaide
Academics of Queen's University Belfast
Academics of Keele University
Professorships at the University of Manchester
Academic staff of the University of Sydney
People educated at Wesley College (Victoria)
Fellows of the Academy of the Social Sciences in Australia